Hans-Jörg Meyer (born April 10, 1964 in Wolfenbüttel, Lower Saxony) is a German sport shooter. He won a silver medal in the men's 50 m free pistol at the 2009 European Shooting Championships in Osijek, Croatia, accumulating a score of 653.8 targets.

At age forty-four, Meyer made his official debut for the 2008 Summer Olympics in Beijing, where he competed in two pistol shooting events, along with his teammate Florian Schmidt. He scored a total of 577 targets in the preliminary rounds of the men's 10 m air pistol, by one point ahead of Belarus' Yury Dauhapolau from the final attempt, finishing only in twenty-first place. Three days later, Meyer placed thirteenth in his second event, 50 m pistol, by two points ahead of U.S. shooter Daryl Szarenski, with a total score of 557 targets.

References

External links
NBC 2008 Olympics profile

German male sport shooters
Living people
Olympic shooters of Germany
Shooters at the 2008 Summer Olympics
People from Wolfenbüttel
Sportspeople from Lower Saxony
1964 births